Danyel Mitchell (born September 16, 1972) is a retired female discus thrower and shot putter from the United States. She set her personal best (54.62 metres) in the women's discus throw event on 1995-08-10 at the World Championships in Gothenburg, Sweden.

Mitchell was a member of the Louisiana State University track and field team.

References

1972 births
Living people
American female discus throwers
American female shot putters
LSU Lady Tigers track and field athletes